On the Road with Judas is a 2007 American drama film written and directed by J. J. Lask and starring Aaron Ruell, Kevin Corrigan, Eddie Kaye Thomas, Eleanor Hutchins, Amanda Loncar, Alex Burns and Leo Fitzpatrick.

Cast
Aaron Ruell as Judas - Real
Kevin Corrigan as JJ Lask
Eddie Kaye Thomas as Judas - Actor
Amanda Loncar as Serra - Actress
Eleanor Hutchins as Serra - Real
Alex Burns as Francis - Real
Leo Fitzpatrick as Francis - Actor
Jim Parsons as Jimmy Pea
J. J. Lask as Rubin Parker Jr.

Reception
The film has a 60% rating on Rotten Tomatoes.

References

External links
 
 

American drama films
2007 drama films
2007 films
2000s English-language films
2000s American films